Čiukšytė is a female Lithuanian surname, its male counterpart is Čiukšys. Notable people with the surname include:

Aldona Čiukšytė (born 1944), Lithuanian rower
Dagnė Čiukšytė (born 1977), Lithuanian chess player

Lithuanian-language feminine surnames